The subantarctic fur seal (Arctocephalus tropicalis) is found in the southern parts of the Indian, Pacific, and Atlantic Oceans. It was first described by Gray in 1872 from a specimen recovered in northern Australia—hence the inappropriate specific name tropicalis.

Description 
The subantarctic fur seal is medium in size compared with other fur seals. Males grow to 2m and 160 kg, whereas females are substantially smaller—1.4m and 50 kg. Both sexes are strongly sexually dimorphic, with creamy-orange chests and faces. Their bellies are more brownish. Males have a dark grey to black back, while females are a lighter grey. Pups are black at birth, but molt at about 3 months old. The snout is short and flat, and the flippers are short and broad. Subantarctic fur seals live for about 20–25 years.

Distribution 
Subantarctic fur seals are geographically widespread. As their name implies, they generally breed in more northerly locations than the Antarctic fur seals. The largest breeding colonies are on Gough Island in the South Atlantic and Île Amsterdam in the southern part of the Indian Ocean. Breeding grounds are also found at Marion Island in the Prince Edward Islands (where an overlap with Antarctic fur seals occurs), the Crozet Islands, and Macquarie Island. Where grounds overlap, the subantarctic species can be identified by the orange colour on the chest.

About 300,000 subantarctic fur seals are alive today, probably substantially down from when they were first discovered in 1810, as they were hunted for their pelts throughout the 19th century. Populations are recovering rapidly, though, in most areas whilst under the protection of the Convention for the Conservation of Antarctic Seals. A small population on Heard Island is endangered. Unlike the Antarctic fur seal, whose genetic variation is low due to hunting making all but one breeding colony extinct by 1900, the diversity amongst subantarctic specimens remains high.

Diet
Subantarctic fur seals hunt in shallow waters at night, when myctophid fish come close to the surface. They also feed on squid.

See also

References

Further reading 
Wynen, Louise P. et al. "Postsealing genetic variation and population structure of two species of fur seal (Arctocephalus gazella and A. tropicalis)". Molecular Ecology. Vol. 9. (2000). pp. 299–314.
 
 

Arctocephalus
Pinnipeds of Africa
Pinnipeds of South America
Fauna of subantarctic islands
Mammals of Argentina
Mammals of Chile
Pinnipeds of Australia
Mammals of New South Wales
Mammals of Victoria (Australia)
Mammals of Western Australia
Fauna of Gough Island
Fauna of Heard Island and McDonald Islands
Fauna of the Prince Edward Islands
Île Amsterdam
Mammals described in 1872
Taxa named by John Edward Gray
Carnivorans of Africa
Carnivorans of South America
Least concern biota of South America